An election to the Carmarthen Rural District Council was held in March 1907. It was preceded by the 1904 election and followed by the 1910 election. The successful candidates were also elected to the Carmarthen Board of Guardians. Around half the members were returned unopposed.

Ward Results

Abergwili (two seats)

Abernant (one seat)

Conwil (two seats)

Laugharne Parish (one seat)

Laugharne Township (one seat)

Llanarthney (two seats)
Stephen Stephens, a member of the Council since its formation, was defeated.

Llandawke and Llansadurnen (one seat)

Llanddarog (one seat)

Llandeilo Abercowyn and Llangynog (one seat)

Llanddowror (one seat)
No candidate was nominated therefore the sitting member, Benjamin Thomas, was deemed to be re-elected.

Llandyfaelog (one seat)

Llanfihangel Abercowin (one seat)

Llangain (one seat)

Llangendeirne (two seats)

Llangunnor (one seat)

Llangynin (one seat)

Llanllawddog (one seat)

Llanpumsaint (one seat)

Llanstephan (one seat)

Llanwinio (one seat)

Merthyr (one seat)

Mydrim (one seat)

Newchurch (one seat)

St Clears (one seat)

St Ishmaels (one seat)

Trelech a'r Betws (two seats)

Carmarthen Board of Guardians

All members of the District Council also served as members of Carmarthen Board of Guardians. In addition six members were elected to represent the borough of Carmarthen.

There was a contested election which saw the five retiring members re-elected.

Carmarthen (six seats)

References

1907 Welsh local elections
Elections in Carmarthenshire
20th century in Carmarthenshire